A. L. Phillips was an American college football player and coach. He played football as a halfback at Washington & Jefferson College in Washington, Pennsylvania and was captain of the 1900 Washington & Jefferson football team before graduating in 1901. Phillips served as the head football coach at Cumberland University in Lebanon, Tennessee from 1902 to 1904. He led the  1903 Cumberland Bulldogs to share of the Southern Intercollegiate Athletic Association (SIAA) title.

Phillips was later treasurer of the Union Trust Company of Washington, Pennsylvania.

Head coaching record

References

Year of birth missing
Year of death missing
19th-century players of American football
American bankers
American football halfbacks
Cumberland Phoenix football coaches
Washington & Jefferson Presidents football players